Lockheed Martin Transit Center (signed as simply Lockheed Martin station on many signs) is a light rail and transit bus station operated by Santa Clara Valley Transportation Authority (VTA), located in Sunnyvale, California.  This station is served by the Orange Line of the VTA Light Rail system.

The land for the transit center was donated by Lockheed Martin during the planning of VTA's Tasman West light rail extension.

Service

Location
The station has a center platform.  It is located at 5th Avenue and North Mathilda Avenue in Sunnyvale, California.  It serves the Lockheed Martin Space Systems complex, the east side of Moffett Federal Airfield and the adjacent industrial area including the headquarters of Yahoo and Juniper Networks.

References

External links 

Santa Clara Valley Transportation Authority light rail stations
Transportation in Sunnyvale, California
Railway stations in the United States opened in 1999
1999 establishments in California